Jesse Byron Dylan (born January 6, 1966) is an American film director and production executive. He is the founder of the media production company Wondros and Lybba, a non-profit organization. He is also a member of the Council on Foreign Relations and TED. He is the son of musician Bob Dylan and former model Sara Lownds and brother of singer-songwriter Jakob Dylan.

Early life and education 
Dylan was born in New York City, and is the eldest son of musician Bob Dylan and Sara Lownds Dylan. His parents are from Jewish families. His siblings include Anna Lea (b. July 11, 1967), Samuel Isaac Abraham (b. July 30, 1968) and Jakob Luke (b. December 9, 1969). In addition, his father adopted Sara's daughter from a prior marriage, Maria Lownds (b. October 21, 1961). Bob and Sara Dylan divorced when Jesse was 11 years old.

Dylan attended New York University film school.

Career 
Dylan began his career directing music videos for clients including Tom Waits, Elvis Costello, Tom Petty, Lita Ford, Public Image Limited and Lenny Kravitz. Dylan is also known for providing the cover photo of Waits' 1992 album Bone Machine.

"Yes We Can" 
In 2008, he directed the will.i.am Emmy Award-winning music video "Yes We Can," inspired by Barack Obama's campaign for President. The film was created in three days, and featured over 30 celebrity supporters singing then-Candidate Barack Obama's New Hampshire Primary concession speech. Originally posted on YouTube, "Yes We Can" received over 26 million views just days after its release, and was recognized by AdAge in 2012 as one of the most influential political ads of all time.

Other work 
His feature film directorial work consists of comedies such as Kicking and Screaming, starring Will Ferrell and Robert Duvall, American Wedding and How High. Other feature-length projects include the documentary Crips and Bloods: Made in America, which explores the culture of gangs and systemic violence in South Los Angeles.  He produced the film for director Stacy Peralta who premiered it at the 2008 Sundance Film Festival. Dylan also produced and directed an original television series, "CONversations with Ricky Jay," which was built around sleight of hand artist Ricky Jay.

Lybba 
In 2007, Dylan launched Lybba, a non-profit organization focused on the open source healthcare movement. The project, according to Fast Company, "combines the latest verified medical data with social networking to allow patients and health-care professionals to make informed decisions." The self-professed goal of the project is "to create an online central repository of medical information." Since their foundation, Lybba has worked with such partners as the Collaborative Chronic Care Network (C3N) and Early Development Systems Initiative (EDSI).

Soros 
In 2020, Dylan was the director and executive producer of "Soros", examining the personal history and public activism of George Soros, the billionaire investor and philanthropist.

Personal life 
Dylan is separated from Susan Traylor, with whom he has a son and a daughter.

References

External links 

Wondros Health
article in The Wall Street Journal
Jesse Dylan/Lybba article on Marketwatch.com
article on Creative Commons Fellowship
 
 
 

American film directors
American people of Polish-Jewish descent
American people of Turkish-Jewish descent
Bob Dylan
Comedy film directors
1966 births
Living people
Tisch School of the Arts alumni
Artists from New York City
American chief executives in the media industry
American music video directors